Pursley is an unincorporated community in Tyler County, West Virginia, United States. Its post office  is closed.

The community most likely derives its name from the surname Parsley.

References 

Unincorporated communities in West Virginia
Unincorporated communities in Tyler County, West Virginia